Barfoot Lookout Complex is a forest lookout situated on Buena Vista Peak in the Douglas Ranger District in the Chiricahua Mountains in Cochise County, Arizona.  It was built in 1935, perhaps by members of the Civilian Conservation Corps.  The complex "represents one of the best examples of its type in the Southwestern Region", and consists of a 14 foot by 14 foot lookout house, shed, privy, concrete cistern, and a native stone retaining wall.  When it was designated by the NHRP, none of the structures had any modifications since they had been built.  The complex is approximately 80 feet by 80 feet, with the retaining wall along the west edge of the boundary.

The structure was destroyed in the Horseshoe 2 Fire in 2011.

References

National Register of Historic Places in Cochise County, Arizona
Buildings and structures completed in 1935
Civilian Conservation Corps in Arizona
1935 establishments in Arizona
Fire lookout towers on the National Register of Historic Places in Arizona
Coronado National Forest